Sahara Castillo (born ) is a retired Peruvian female volleyball player. She was part of the Peru women's national volleyball team at the 1998 FIVB Volleyball Women's World Championship in Japan.

References

External links
http://byucougars.com/athlete/w-volleyball/sahara-castillo
http://usustatesman.com/sahara-castillo-named-new-assistant-volleyball-coach/
http://archive.sltrib.com/article.php?id=6573565&itype=NGPSID&keyword=&qtype=
http://www.deseretnews.com/article/934085/A-lot-of-changes-for-BYU-volleyball.html?pg=all
http://www.deseretnews.com/article/595054901/Araujo-named-Cougars-Male-Athlete-of-the-Year.html

1982 births
Living people
Peruvian women's volleyball players
Place of birth missing (living people)